Malobaikovo (Bäläkäy Bayıq) is a rural locality (a village) in Bayguzinsky Selsoviet, Ishimbaysky District, Bashkortostan, Russia. The population was 148 as of 2010. There are 3 streets.

Geography 
Malobaikovo is located 12 km southeast of Ishimbay (the district's administrative centre) by road. Bayguzino is the nearest rural locality.

References 

Rural localities in Ishimbaysky District